Michael Cuesta (born July 8, 1963) is an American film and television director, best known for his independent films, specially for having co-written and directed the 2001 film, L.I.E. He has directed and produced television series including Six Feet Under, Dexter, Blue Bloods and Homeland.

Life and career
Cuesta was born in New York City. He received a BFA in photography from the School of Visual Arts in 1985. Cuesta co-wrote (with Stephen Ryder and Gerald Cuesta) and directed the 2001 independent film, L.I.E. which starred Paul Dano, Brian Cox, Billy Kay, and Bruce Altman. L.I.E. received critical acclaim and two Independent Spirit Awards at the Sundance Film Festival.

His film L.I.E. led him to become a regular director for the HBO original series, Six Feet Under which aired from 2001–05. According to executive producer Alan Poul, "During the second season, we had hired a director for the fourth episode, but he fell out one week before the start of pre-production. Alan Ball and I were alarmed, but that night we went to see L.I.E., and it was a revelation. The next morning we booked Michael. He's a fantastic fit for the show." Michael Cuesta became a regular director during the 2002 season of Six Feet Under and directed five episodes of the series including the fourth-season premiere, "Falling into Place".

In addition to Six Feet Under and L.I.E., Cuesta has also directed the film, 12 and Holding, which premiered at the Toronto International Film Festival in 2005 and was released by IFC Films theatrically in 2006. Other projects include an adaptation of the novel, The Miracle Life of Edgar Mint.

In 2006 Cuesta directed the pilot episode of the Showtime series, Dexter. The show reunited him with former Six Feet Under star Michael C. Hall in the lead role, Dexter Morgan. Cuesta joined the production staff for the first season and also directed further episodes including the season finale. He left the crew at the end of the first season.

He also directed the second-season finale for the HBO series True Blood which was created and executive produced by Alan Ball, creator and show runner of Six Feet Under.

Cuesta would have executive produced Babylon Fields, a CBS television series about zombies proposed for the 2007–2008 season. The show was not picked up. In 2013 NBC bought the rights to Babylon Fields, choosing Michael Cuesta as the director because of his familiarity with the prior pilot. A pilot was filmed in 2014 but the show was not picked up.

Cuesta directed and executive produced the pilot episode for CBS drama Blue Bloods in 2010. The series was created by Robin Green and Mitchell Burgess and focuses on a family of New York police officers. He returned to direct the eighth episode of the first season "Chinatown".

He was nominated for a Primetime Emmy Award for directing Homelands Pilot episode.

In 2011, he directed the film Roadie starring Ron Eldard as a man who returns home to Queens, NY after twenty years on the road with Blue Öyster Cult. Co-written with his brother Gerald Cuesta and featuring supporting roles by Jill Hennessy, Bobby Cannavale, Lois Smith and David Margulies, the film was screened at the Stony Brook Film Festival, Vancouver International Film Festival and Austin Film Festival in 2011. It was released by Magnolia Pictures on January 6, 2012.

In February 2013 Cuesta was set up to direct the film Kill the Messenger for 2014 release date, Jeremy Renner will be leading the film. Filming started in the summer of 2013 in Atlanta. In January 2015 was named as the director, of the pilot episode of Fox Television Studios drama horror series Frankenstein, based on Mary Shelley's novel Frankenstein.

FilmographyFilm L.I.E. (2001)
 12 and Holding (2005)
 Tell-Tale (2009)
 Roadie (2011)
 Kill the Messenger (2014)
 American Assassin'' (2017)Television'

References

External links
 

1963 births
Living people
American television directors
American male screenwriters
Film directors from New York City
School of Visual Arts alumni
Screenwriters from New York (state)